Albertus Perk (16 September 188714 May 1919) was a Dutch fencer. He competed in the individual épée event at the 1912 Summer Olympics. Perk, a Dutch Army and Air Force officer, was killed in 1919 when the Rumpler C.VIII he was a passenger of exploded in mid-air.

References

External links
 

1887 births
1919 deaths
Dutch male épée fencers
Olympic fencers of the Netherlands
Fencers at the 1912 Summer Olympics
People from Anna Paulowna
Royal Netherlands Army officers
Royal Netherlands Air Force officers
Victims of aviation accidents or incidents in 1919
Victims of aviation accidents or incidents in Germany
Sportspeople from North Holland